Sven Krause (born 19 January 1986) is a retired German footballer.

References

External links
 

Living people
German footballers
1986 births
SC Paderborn 07 players
SC Preußen Münster players
1. FC Saarbrücken players
2. Bundesliga players
3. Liga players
SC Wiedenbrück 2000 players
Association football forwards
SV Lippstadt 08 players
Sportspeople from Paderborn
Footballers from North Rhine-Westphalia